Eirmotus furvus is a species of cyprinid in the genus Eirmotus. It lives in Sumatra, Indonesia, and has a maximum length of 3.4 cm (1.34 inches).

References

Cyprinidae
Cyprinid fish of Asia
Fish of Indonesia